The Washington State Capitol or Legislative Building in Olympia is the home of the government of the state of Washington. It contains chambers for the Washington State Legislature and offices for the governor, lieutenant governor, secretary of state and treasurer and is part of a campus consisting of several buildings.  Buildings for the Washington Supreme Court, executive agencies and the Washington Governor's Mansion are part of the capitol campus.

History
After Olympia became capital city of the Washington Territory in 1853, the city's founder, Edmund Sylvester, gave the legislature  of land upon which to build the capitol, located on a hill overlooking what is now known as Capitol Lake. A two-story wood-frame building was constructed on the site, where the legislature met starting in 1854. When President Benjamin Harrison approved Washington's state constitution in 1889, he donated  of federal lands to the state with the stipulation that income from the lands was to be used solely for construction of the state capitol.

The legislature formed the State Capitol Commission in 1893 to oversee the creation of a new capitol on the property in Olympia. The commission had a nationwide competition to find an architect and chose the submission of Ernest Flagg. Construction began on Flagg's plan, but was soon stalled by poor economic conditions with only the foundation completed. When the legislature finally approved an appropriation of additional funds in 1897, newly elected Governor John Rogers vetoed it. Rogers advocated the purchase of the existing Thurston County Courthouse in downtown Olympia, now known as the "Old Capitol" and home to the Office of Superintendent of Public Instruction. The legislature approved the new location and began meeting there in 1905.

The courthouse became the location of all agencies of the state government and within a few years the legislature decided the building was too small and a new State Capitol Commission convened in 1911. This time, the commission was interested in constructing a group of buildings to serve as the capitol rather than a single facility and selected the design submitted by the company Walter Wilder and Harry White. Wilder and White's designs were influenced by the Olmsted brothers who served as consultants from 1911 to 1912 and designed and supervised the landscaping for the campus from 1927 to 1931.  Construction of the campus began in 1912, and the Temple of Justice was completed in 1920, followed by the Insurance Building and the power and heating plant. After multiple revisions of the plans, the Legislative Building was completed in 1928. Additional buildings on the campus were constructed during the next several decades.

The Capitol Campus was placed on the National Register of Historic Districts in 1974 and contains or contributes to some of the most valued views in the State including the Olympic Mountains, Puget Sound, Mt. Rainier, the Capitol Dome and the Capitol Group of buildings on the hill.  The design of the Capitol Campus is a grand example of the City Beautiful style of the Progressive era of the early 20th Century

Buildings 

Located on the campus are the Legislative Building, Temple of Justice, John A. Cherberg Senate office building, Irv Newhouse Senate office building, Insurance Building, John L. O'Brien House office building, Joel M. Pritchard Building, and several other office buildings. The Capitol Conservatory, built in 1939 by the Works Progress Administration, housed various types of flora until it was permanently closed on September 5, 2008. The campus also hosts many veterans' memorials.

The state seal, which is featured throughout the buildings on the state flag, tapestries, railing, door handles and elsewhere, was designed by Olympia Jeweler Charles Talcot by making two circles and putting a two-cent stamp of George Washington in the middle.  There is even a bronze version of the seal in the floor of the rotunda.  Over time, George Washington's nose has worn down due to foot traffic on it and it is now roped-off to prevent further damage.

Legislative Building

The Legislative Building houses the chambers of the Washington State Legislature and offices of several elected officials. A number of features in the structure commemorating Washington's addition to the Union as the 42nd state—42 steps lead to the building's North entrance and one of the four 42-star flags owned by the state is displayed in the State Reception Room. Flags with this number of stars were never official because of the admission of Idaho shortly after Washington.

The building has a rectangular footprint and is constructed of brick and concrete and faced on the exterior with sandstone quarried from Wilkeson, Washington. The first floor is within the raised base and houses offices. The second and third floors are surrounded by Doric columns and capped with a cornice that encircles the building. The fourth floor is covered with a gabled roof that is situated behind the cornice on the third floor. On the north facade, the entrance is in a portico framed by eight Corinthian columns reached by 42 granite steps. A similar portico is on the south facade but it covers a vehicle ramp to the lower level instead of steps. The dome is surrounded by four small sandstone domes and capped by a lantern and lightning rod. The floors and many interior walls are covered by Alaskan marble and marble from Belgium, France, Germany, Italy are used in other parts of the interior.

All lamps and Roman fire pots in the rotunda were made by Louis Comfort Tiffany, son of Charles Lewis Tiffany, founder of Tiffany and Company. These comprise the largest collection of Tiffany bronze in the world and Tiffany's last large commission before his death in 1933. It could fit a full-size Volkswagen Beetle if put in sideways and features life-size faces, human figures, and 202 lights.

The Legislative Building is also home to a large brass bust of George Washington. Over time, the nose on the bust has become shiny from visitors rubbing it for good luck.

Other buildings

Facing the Legislative Building is the Temple of Justice, home to the State Supreme Court and the State Law Library. Until 1924, the unused boiler and coal rooms located under the Temple of Justice housed the Division of Highways Testing Laboratory, which would later become the Department of Transportation Materials Laboratory.

The Governor's Mansion is located immediately west of the Legislative Building. Built before the rest of the capitol campus in 1908, the four-story Georgian-style mansion was intended as a temporary structure, and over the years the state legislature has considered replacing it with an office building or a new mansion. The legislature decided to renovate and remodel the existing building in 1973, and since then the private, non-profit Governor's Mansion Foundation has maintained it.

Art and monuments

There are 18 major art installations and monuments on the campus. The Winged Victory monument, commemorating World War I, is one of the most prominent. Sculpted by Alonzo Victor Lewis from bronze, its granite pedestal has four inscriptions. Dedicated May 30, 1938, the monument has been restored numerous times since then. The Tivoli Fountain replica was designed by the architects Wohleb, Wohleb, and Bennett. Inscribed upon it is "Replica of the Tivoli Fountain—Tivoli Park, Copenhagen, Denmark. Presented to the State of Washington by Olympia-Tumwater Foundation. Peter G. Schmidt, President. 1953." Other points of interest include World War II, Korean War, Vietnam War, medal of honor, POW–MIA, and law enforcement memorials; Arc of Statehood; Boiler Works; Du Pen Fountain; Mysteries of Life; Sea to Sky; The Shaman; an untitled sculpture by Lee Kelly (1973); Territorial Sundial; the Water Garden; and Woman Dancing. General George Washington, a colossal portrait by Avard Fairbanks, is placed in the reception room (another is installed at Washington University Medical School in Washington, D.C.).

Natural disasters 

Three major earthquakes have affected the capital since its construction. The first, in 1949, damaged the cupola of the Legislative Building's dome so badly it had to be completely replaced. A 6.5 magnitude earthquake in 1965 had even worse results, with the dome's brick buttresses left in such poor condition that a major aftershock could have caused them to collapse entirely, according to a state report. The state performed work after both earthquakes to reduce the impact of future occurrences, and performed additional seismic improvements in 1975. The Nisqually earthquake of 2001 caused further damage, including a splintered buttress, but the earthquake-resistance work prevented more serious harm to the building.

Wilder and White's designs for the dome, weighing 26,000 metric tons, called for the dome to be fixed to its supporting structures by gravity instead of by any bolts or fasteners. During an earthquake, the dome could shift, along with the sandstone columns supporting it. The columns moved as much as three inches (76 mm) during the Nisqually earthquake. Renovations completed in 2004 by Design Company EYP Architecture & Engineering fixed the dome permanently to the rest of the building.

Quirks of law and security 
Because the Capitol grounds are outside the normal jurisdiction of Olympia and Thurston County, the sheriff and city police do not investigate crime on the Capitol campus.  The Washington State Patrol is responsible for law enforcement and investigations on the Capitol grounds as well as at the Old Capitol Building and adjoining Sylvester Park in downtown Olympia. The Senate and House also have their own security staff.

After the September 11th attacks, there was a security checkpoint at the entrance to the Capitol building, complete with magnetometer and x-ray machine, but security has since reverted to its original state.  Until 2021 the open carry of firearms was allowed in the building.

Controversies
In December 2008, an atheist sign was displayed adjacent to a nativity scene in the Capitol as part of a Christmas display; it was erected by the Freedom From Religion Foundation in response to the nativity scene. This sparked widespread media coverage and controversy; the sign was stolen, but eventually found and returned to the Capitol. There was a rapid influx of requests from individuals and groups wanting to display other material, including a Festivus pole and a request by the Westboro Baptist Church to display a sign saying (among other things) "Santa Claus will take you to hell."

Gallery

See also
List of state and territorial capitols in the United States
List of tallest domes

References 
 General
 Johnston, Norman J. Washington's Audacious State Capitol and Its Builders. Seattle: University of Washington Press, 1988. 

Specific

External links 

State Capitol Visitor Information
Governor's Mansion 
Governor's Mansion Foundation
Washington State Legislature
Washington State Capitol – Photographs from a visit to the capitol

Buildings and structures in Olympia, Washington
Government buildings in Washington (state)
Government buildings with domes
Government of Washington (state)
Historic districts on the National Register of Historic Places in Washington (state)
History of Olympia, Washington
National Register of Historic Places in Olympia, Washington
State capitols in the United States
Tourist attractions in Olympia, Washington
Washington State Capitol campus
Works Progress Administration in Washington (state)